Battlebridge Basin is a canal basin in King's Cross, in the London Borough of Islington. It is located off the Regent's Canal.

Current use
The basin contains a number of residential moorings. It is the site of the London Canal Museum, opened in 1992, and Kings Place development completed in 2008 and home to The Guardian.

History
The basin was constructed in 1820 at the same time as the second half of the canal from Camden Town to Limehouse, though the wharf buildings were not completed until 1822. It was originally known as Horsfall Basin after the original landowner, and later as Maiden Lane Basin. Its current name comes from the former name for the King's Cross area, named after an ancient bridge over the River Fleet.

The canal museum buildings were used in the second half of the 19th century and early 20th century for the storage of ice from Norway and its distribution to the surrounding area.

See also
List of canal basins in the United Kingdom

References

Regent's Canal
Canal basins in England and Wales